University of Illinois Chicago School of Law is a public law school in Chicago, Illinois. Founded in 1899, the school offers programs for both part-time and full-time students, with both day and night classes available, and offers January enrollment.

History and location 
UIC Law was founded in 1899 as the John Marshall Law School and initially accredited by the American Bar Association in 1951. It merged with the University of Illinois at Chicago in 2019, becoming the UIC John Marshall Law School. On May 20, 2021, following review by a university task force, the school announced its official change of name to University of Illinois Chicago School of Law, effective July 1. The board of trustees acknowledged that "newly discovered research", uncovered by historian Paul Finkelman, had revealed that influential 19th century U.S. Supreme Court Chief Justice John Marshall was a slave trader and owner who practiced "pro-slavery jurisprudence", which was deemed inappropriate for the school's namesake.

UIC Law is located in Chicago's central financial and legal district, most commonly known as The Loop. It is across the street from the Dirksen Federal Building, which houses the U.S. Court of Appeals for the Seventh Circuit and the U.S. District Court for the Northern District of Illinois, and about four blocks from the Daley Center, which houses the Circuit Court of Cook County. It is also next door to the Chicago Bar Association.

Post-graduation employment and background 
According to the school's official 2020 ABA-required disclosures, 81% of the Class of 2020 secured full-time employment within nine months after graduation. 71% of graduates in the Class of 2020 passed the bar exam on their first try. The vast majority of graduates work in Illinois after graduating. After Illinois, the next most popular states are Michigan, Florida, California, and New York.

Many graduates go into public service, 19% of Class of 2020 graduates work in public service and 5% of graduates work at a national law firm.

Admissions and costs 
The Fall 2020 entering class had a median GPA of 3.29 and a median LSAT of 151. Tuition and fees at UIC Law for the 2020-2021 academic year is $39,014 for Illinois residents and $48,014 for out of state residents.

Curriculum 
UIC Law has day and evening divisions, with identical instruction, course content, and scholastic requirements. Lawyering Skills courses, which focus on writing, research, and oral argument, are an integral part of the core curriculum. These courses are taught in small groups, to maximize the individual attention given to each student. A student may earn a J.D. certificate in a certain area of the law or focus more emphatically and earn a joint degree (J.D./LL.M.).

The law school also offers Master of Laws (LL.M.) and Master of Jurisprudence (M.J.) programs for practicing attorneys and non-attorney professionals and other individual students.

UIC School of Law offers seven Master of Laws (LL.M.) programs for attorneys seeking specialized education in legal issues and for current J.D. students who would like the maximum concentration in particular areas of the law. UIC Law offers a comprehensive curriculum in the following areas: Employee Benefits Law, Estate Planning, Information Technology and Privacy Law, Intellectual Property Law, International Business and Trade Law, Real Estate Law, and Tax Law.

Clinics, externships, and special programs 
UIC Law students are required to earn three experiential learning credits – working in a clinic, externship, or a combination of both – in order to graduate. The law school offers students practical opportunities through its seven Community Legal Clinics and more than 50 externship placement sites. Clinics include the Community Enterprise & Solidarity Economy Clinic, Fair Housing Legal Support Center & Clinic, International Human Rights Clinic, USPTO-certified IP Patent Clinic, USPTO-certified IP Trademark Clinic, Pro Bono Litigation Clinic, and the Veterans Legal Clinic. Externship opportunities include judicial, governmental, and non-profit placements, as well as a Semester-in-Practice program that allows JD students to earn a semester of credit hours immersed in a legal market outside of Chicago.

Global Legal Skills Conference Series 

The Global Legal Skills Conference Series was founded in 2005 as a forum for professors who teach Legal English and international legal skills to exchange information on teaching techniques and materials. The conference built upon the law school's strengths in legal writing education, trial advocacy, and international legal education, creating a specialized conference connecting legal writing professionals and other professors who had an interest in teaching international students and lawyers who spoke English as a second language. Since its inception, the Global Legal Skills Conference has been held four times in Chicago, once in Washington, D.C., twice in Mexico, twice in Costa Rica, and twice in Italy. The conference now also includes presentations of GLS Awards for individual achievement, institutional vision, and outstanding publications.

Library 
The Louis L. Biro Law Library occupies the 6th – 10th floors of the law school's State Street building. A team of professional librarians and staff members work to serve the students during the 96 hours/week that the library is open. The library holds over 263,003 volumes and microform equivalents and provides on-campus and remote access to some of those titles via their specialty electronic databases.  It is continually adding more online subscriptions to its growing collection of electronic resources, including Lexis, Westlaw, CALI Lessons, BNA Premier, IICLE SmartBooks, Max Planck Encyclopedia of Public International Law Online, Justis International Law Reports, Courtroom View Network, which contains audio versions of law school casebooks and streaming trial videos, and Mango languages, an easy to follow system for learning over 20 different languages.

Students have wireless access throughout the law school and the library offers seating for 750, including twelve group study rooms.  In addition to supporting the research & instructional needs of the students, faculty & staff of the law school, the library is also open to law school alumni and members of the Chicago Bar Association, whose headquarters building is next door.

Student activities 
There are four honors programs:  UIC Law Review, UIC Review of Intellectual Property Law ("RIPL"), the Moot Court Honors Program, and the Trial Advocacy & Dispute Resolution Honors Program. UIC Law sends teams to more than 30 moot court and mock trial competitions annually.

The student community at UIC Law includes more than 50 student organizations engaging in social awareness, community service, legal discussions, and social activities.

Notable alumni and faculty

Alumni 

Charles F. Armstrong – Illinois state representative and lawyer
Adamantios Androutsopoulos – Lawyer, professor, and the Prime Minister of Greece from 1973 to 1974.
Donald W. Banner – United States Commissioner of Patents and Trademarks 1978–1979.
Dan Bellino – Major League Baseball Baseball umpire.
Femi Gbaja Biamila – Nigerian Lawyer, Action Congress politician, and Minority Whip of the House of Representatives of Nigeria.
Joe Birkett – DuPage County State's Attorney and former Republican nominee for Illinois Lieutenant Governor.
Otto Bock – former justice of the Colorado Supreme Court.
Michael J. Burke – Illinois Supreme Court Justice
Archibald Carey, Jr. – Judge, Chicago alderman and pastor of Quinn Chapel AME Church.
John W. Cox, Jr. – Democratic member of the United States House of Representatives from the 16th District of Illinois from 1991 to 1993.
William M. Daley – former White House Chief Of Staff under President Barack Obama. Served as U.S. Secretary of Commerce from 1997 to 2000.
Chauncey Eskridge – lawyer for Martin Luther King Jr. and Muhammad Ali 
Timothy C. Evans – Chief Judge of the Circuit Court of Cook County.
Thomas W. Ewing – Republican member of the United States House of Representatives from the 15th District of Illinois from 1991 to 2001.
Thomas R. Fitzgerald – former chief justice of the Illinois Supreme Court.
Charles E. Freeman – first African-American justice of the Illinois Supreme Court.
Michael Hastings – Democratic member of the Illinois Senate, representing the 19th District since 2013.
Michael Holewinski - Illinois state legislator and lawyer
Cheryl Johnson (Class of 1973) – judge of the Texas Court of Criminal Appeals in Austin, Texas, since 1999
Iain D. Johnston – United States district judge of the United States District Court for the Northern District of Illinois
William E. King, John Marshall Law School, state legislator
Darin LaHood – Republican member of the United States House of Representatives from the 18th District of Illinois from 2015 to present.
LeRoy Lemke – Illinois state legislator and lawyer
Blanche M. Manning – United States District Court Judge for the Northern District of Illinois.
Howard Thomas Markey – first chief judge of the United States Court of Appeals for the Federal Circuit and former dean of The John Marshall Law School.
Adrian Neritani – former permanent representative of Albania to the United Nations.
Michael Noland – Democratic member of the Illinois Senate, representing the 22nd District since 2007.
Charles Ronald Norgle Sr. – United States district judge for the U.S. District Court for the Norther District of Illinois.
Anthony J. Peraica – former Cook County commissioner (2 terms, 16th Dist.) and attorney.
Mark Pedowitz – current president of The CW Television Network.
Mara Candelaria Reardon – Indiana state representative for the 12th District (2007–2015 and 2017 – present)
Alexander J. Resa – U.S. representative from Illinois from 1945 to 1947.
Edith S. Sampson – first Black U.S. delegate appointed to the United Nations.
Evelyn Sanguinetti – first Latina Lieutenant governor (United States) in U.S. history and lieutenant governor of Illinois (2015 to 2019).
James E. Shadid – District Court Judge for the United States District Court for the Central District of Illinois.
Ira Silverstein – Democratic member of the Illinois Senate, representing the 8th District since 1999.
John Smietanka – Prosecutor for Berrien County, Michigan from 1974 to 1981, and a United States Attorney in Western Michigan, appointed by Ronald Reagan, from 1981 until 1994.
Wanda Stopa – Chicago's first woman assistant U.S. district attorney.
David Ivar Swanson – Illinois state representative for the 11th District (1922–46 and 1948–50).
Emanuel Chris Welch – Illinois speaker of the house and state representative
Kenneth Wendt – former member of the Illinois House of Representatives and judge of the Circuit Court of Cook County.
Michael J. Zalewski – Illinois state representative for the 23rd District (2008 to present).

Faculty 
John W. Darrah – United States district judge
Elmer Gertz – lawyer, writer and civil rights activist, best known as the plaintiff in Gertz v. Robert Welch, Inc.
Arthur J. Goldberg – taught at The John Marshall Law School in the 1930s, 1940s, and 1950s before becoming a U.S. Supreme Court Associate Justice and then the U.S. Ambassador to the United Nations.
Fred F. Herzog – former dean and the only Jewish judge to serve in Austria between the world wars.
Ann Claire Williams – United States circuit judge for the U.S. Court of Appeals for the Seventh Circuit.

References

External links 

Official website

Law schools in Illinois
Universities and colleges in Chicago
Educational institutions established in 1899
Independent law schools in the United States
1899 establishments in Illinois
University of Illinois Chicago